React is the fifth solo studio album by American rapper and producer Erick Sermon. It was released on November 19, 2002 via J Records, making it his second and final album for the label. Recording sessions took place at L.I.T.E. Recording Studios in Long Island, New York. Production was handled primarily by Sermon, except for several tracks, which were produced by Just Blaze, Andre Ramseur, Kaos, Megahertz and Rick Rock. The album features guest appearances from Free Marie, Icarus, Keith Murray, Khari, Lyric, MC Lyte, Rah Digga, Red Café, Redman, Sy Scott and Gregory Howard.

The album spawned two singles: "React", which made it to #36 on the Billboard Hot 100, and "Love Iz". React peaked at number 72 on the Billboard 200 albums chart in the United States.

Track listing

Sample credits
Love Iz
"Love and Happiness" by Al Green
"King of Rock" by Run-DMC
"La Di Da Di" by Slick Rick
Hold Up Dub
"No Sleep till Brooklyn" by Beastie Boys
"Let Me Clear My Throat" by Kool & the Gang
"Shut 'Em Down" by Public Enemy
Hip Hop Radio
"Angie Baby" by Helen Reddy, written by Alan O'Day
Don't Give Up
"Inside Out" by Odyssey, written by Jesse Rae
React
"React" contains a sample of female Hindi-language singer Meena Kapoor performing 'Chandhi Ka Badan' from the 1963 Bollywood film Taj Mahal. The sampled line, 'Kisi Ko Khudkushi ka shok ho tow uh huh kya kare' translates as "If someone has suicidal interests, what can we do?" to which Sermon responds, "Whatever she said, then I'm that". The use of the sample drew criticism from the Hindi-speaking community.

Chart history

References

External links

2002 albums
J Records albums
Erick Sermon albums
Albums produced by Rick Rock
Albums produced by Just Blaze
Albums produced by Erick Sermon